Jilong may refer to:

Keelung (基隆市), or Jilong from its pinyin name, city of Taiwan, Republic of China

Mainland China
All of the following entries are written as "吉隆":
Gyirong County, or Jilong from its Chinese name, Shigatse Prefecture, Tibet AR
Gyirong Town, town in Gyirong County
Gyirong (village), village in Gyirong County